Windward Passages is a studio album released by jazz pianist Dave Burrell and saxophonist David Murray. It was recorded in 1993 and released later that year on December 3 on the Italian Black Saint label. The album is an update/sequel to Burrell's album Windward Passages (1979) on hatART.

The album also features Burrell's wife, Monika Larsson, on the track "Cela Me Va" performing a spoken word reading. However, Murray's playing "ends up drowning her out to an extent."

Track listing 
"Sorrow Song (For W.E.B. Dubois)" (Murray) – 8:29
"It Hurts So Much to See" (Larsson) – 8:00
"Naima [Take 2]" (Coltrane) – 11:33
"Cela Me Va" (Larsson) – 5:26
"The Crave" (Morton) – 6:04
"Zanzibar Blue" (Burrell) – 9:22
"Conversation With Our Mothers" (Murray) – 6:09
"Naima [Take 1]" (Coltrane) – 13:59

Personnel 
Dave Burrell – piano
David Murray – clarinet (bass), saxophone (tenor)
Giovanni Bonandrini – producer
Maria Bonandrini, Max Martino – artwork
Aldo Borrelli, Paolo Falascone – engineers
Monika Larsson – vocals on "Cela Me Va"

Reception 

Though AllMusic begins their review saying the album is "a bit unusual," they ultimately recommend it because it is "one of the better and more accessible recordings of both David Murray and Dave Burrell."

References 

1993 albums
Dave Burrell albums
David Murray (saxophonist) albums
Black Saint/Soul Note albums